Silistra is a town in Northeastern Bulgaria. The town lies on the southern bank of the lower Danube river, and is also the part of the Romanian border where it stops following the Danube. Silistra is the administrative center of the Silistra Province and one of the important towns of the historical region of Southern Dobrudzha.

Silistra is a major cultural, industrial, transportation, and educational center of Northeastern Bulgaria. There are many historical landmarks including a richly-decorated Late Roman tomb, remains of the Medieval fortress, an Ottoman fort, and an art gallery.

Etymology 
The name Silistra is possibly derived from the root of the old Thracian name of the lower part of the Danube "Istrum". By another theory, the city's name

Geography 

Silistra is in the northeastern part of Bulgaria on the southern bank of the Danube River. It is located in the Bulgarian part of Dobrudzha.

The municipality of Silistra covers an area of 516 km2 and includes the town and 18 villages. The area of the city-proper is 27.159 km2.

Silistra is 431 km from Sofia, the capital of Bulgaria; 141 km from Varna; and 119 km from Ruse.

Climate 
Silistra has a continental climate, with cold snowy winters and hot summers.

History 

The Romans built a fortress in AD 29 on the site of an earlier Thracian settlement and kept its name, Durostorum (or Dorostorum). The earliest saints of Bulgaria are Roman soldiers executed at Durostorum during the Diocletian Persecution (303–313), including St. Dasius and St. Julius the Veteran. 
Durostorum became an important military center of the Roman province of Moesia, and grew into a city at the time of Marcus Aurelius. Durostorum became the seat of a Christian bishopric and a center of Christianity in the region. Auxentius was expelled from Durostorum by an edict of Theodosius depriving Arian bishops in 383, and took refuge at Milan where he became embroiled in controversy with St Ambrose. The Roman general Flavius Aëtius was born in the town in 396. As part of the Bulgarian Empire Durostolon was known as Drastar in Medieval times.

In 895 (during the Bulgarian-Hungarian War of 894–896), the Hungarians, allies of the Byzantines, besieged the Bulgarian army under the personal command of Simeon I the Great in the fortress of the town but were repulsed. The next year the Hungarians were decisively defeated in the battle of Southern Buh.

The town was captured by the forces of Sviatoslav I of Kiev in 969, but two years later it was taken by the Byzantines during the Battle of Dorostolon. It was renamed Theodoropolis, after military saint Theodore Stratelates, who is said to have come to the aid of Emperor John I Tzimiskes during the battle. In 976, Tsar Samuel restored Bulgarian rule in the region until 1001, when it once again became part of the Byzantine Empire.

In 1186, after the Rebellion of Asen and Peter, the town became part of the Second Bulgarian Empire and renamed Drastar.

In 1279, under Emperor Ivailo, Drastar was attacked by the Mongols; but after a three-month-long siege the Bulgarians managed to break through. The town remained part of the Bulgarian Empire until the Ottoman conquest of the Balkans around 1400. Throughout the Middle Ages, Drastar (possibly known by the name Silistra too) was among Bulgaria's largest and most important cities.

During Ottoman rule, Silistra was part of Rumelia Province and was the administrative centre of the Silistra district (sanjak). This district was later upgraded to become the Silistra Province and stretched over most of the western Black Sea littoral.

The town was captured and recaptured by Russian forces numerous times during several Russo-Turkish Wars and was besieged between 14 April and 23 June 1854 during the Crimean War. Namık Kemal wrote his most famous play, Vatan Yahut Silistre ("Homeland or Silistre"), a drama about the siege of Silistra, in which he expounded on the ideas of patriotism and liberalism. The play was first staged on 1 April 1873 and led to his exile to Famagusta.

The Ottoman Silistra Province was reduced in size, as the districts of Özi and Hocabey and the region of Bessarabia were ceded to the Russian Empire at the end of the 18th century and the beginning of the 19th century.  Edirne Province was created from its southern regions in 1830. Finally, Silistra Province merged with the provinces of Vidin and Niš in 1864 to form Danube Province. Silistra was downgraded to a kaza centre in Ruse district in this province in the same year.

Between 1819 and 1826, Eliezer Papo — a renowned Jewish scholar — was the rabbi of the community of Silistra, making this town famous among observant Jews. Up to the present, his grave is a focus of pilgrimage, some pilgrims flying from Israel and even from Latin America to Bulgaria for that purpose.

In 1878, following the Russo-Turkish War of 1877–1878, Silistra was included in Bulgaria. Romania was opposed to this as it wanted to acquire the city and established the short-lived Silistra Nouă County, which was abolished a year later.

In May 1913, following the Second Balkan War and after unsuccessful Bulgarian-Romanian negotiations in London, the two countries accepted the mediation of the Great Powers, who awarded Silistra and the area in a 3 km radius around it to Romania at the Saint Petersburg Conference. The 1913 Treaty of Bucharest ceded Silistra and the whole of Southern Dobruja to Romania. Bulgaria regained the town from 1916 during World War I. This became finalised with the Treaty of Bucharest in 1918 after Romania surrendered to the Central Powers (of which Bulgaria was a part). The Treaty of Neuilly (1919) following World War I returned it to Romania. Silistra remained a part of Romania until the Axis-sponsored Treaty of Craiova in 1940, when the town once again became part of Bulgaria, a transfer confirmed by the Paris Peace Treaties in 1947. Between 1913 and 1938, Silistra was the capital of Durostor County (except during Bulgarian rule).  It became part of Ținutul Mării ("Sea District") between 1938 and 1940 during Romanian rule. Following the establishment of the People's Republic of Bulgaria, Silistra developed as a center of industry and agriculture in the region, comparable to Ruse (because of the strategic position on the Danube) and Dobrich (due to the abundant fertile lands). This led to a major population increase which continued until 1985. After that, the population slowly started to decrease. Following the collapse of the People's Republic in 1989,  many of its inhabitants migrated to other parts of the country or emigrated outside Bulgaria.

Population 
In January 2012, Silistra was inhabited by 35 230 people within the city limits, while the Silistra Municipality along with the legally affiliated adjacent villages had 50 780 inhabitants. The number of the residents of the city (not the municipality) reached its peak in the period 1986–1991, when it exceeded 70,000. The following table presents the change of the population after 1887.

Ethnic, linguistic and religious composition
According to the latest 2011 census data, the individuals declared their ethnic identity were distributed as follows:
Bulgarians: 29,677 (88.3%)
Turks: 3,458 (10.3%)
Romani: 123 (0.4%)
Others: 190 (0.6%)
Indefinable: 180 (0.5%)
Undeclared: 1,979 (5.6%)
Total: 35,607

Notable people
Flavius Aetius (396 – 454), a Roman general, defeated Attila the Hun
Parteniy Pavlovich - cleric, author of the first autobiography in South Slavic literature
Yıldız İbrahimova - jazz singer
Veselin Metodiev - former minister of culture
Orfi (1943 – 1999), magician
Denislav Kalchev (1973 –), swimmer

Twin towns – sister cities 
Silistra is twinned with:

  Veles, North Macedonia
  Dunaújváros, Hungary
  Dresden, Germany
  Leskovac, Serbia
  Lüleburgaz, Turkey
  Slobozia, Romania
  Lida, Belarus
  Óbuda-Békásmegyer, Hungary

Honour
Silistra Knoll on Livingston Island in the South Shetland Islands, Antarctica is named after Silistra.

"Silistra" is also the name of a fictional planet in Janet Morris' book High Couch of Silistra (1977).

References

External links

Official municipality website (in Bulgarian and English)
News from UNESCO nature reserve in Silistra
Awarded "EDEN - European Destinations of Excellence" non traditional tourist destination 2010

 
Populated places in Silistra Province
Port cities and towns in Bulgaria
Populated places on the Danube
Bulgaria–Romania border crossings
Jewish pilgrimage sites
Capitals of former Romanian counties